A double abrogative referendum was held in Italy on 15 May 2003. Voters were asked whether small companies should be forced to re-employ workers they had sacked illegitimately and whether the property owners could refuse to allow electricity cables to be installed on private property. Although both were approved by wide margins, the voter turnout of 26% was well below the 50% threshold and the results were invalidated.

Results

Forcing small companies to re-employ illegitimately fired workers

Refusal to allow electricity cables to be installed on private property

References

Italian referendum
Referendum
Referendums in Italy
Italian referendum